The Etna Turpentine Camp Archeological Site is an abandoned turpentine camp near Inverness, Florida. Records indicate it was built in the early 1900s. It was discovered by accident when the Florida Gas Transmission Company was exploring a route for a possible pipeline. The site was added to the National Register of Historic Places on December 10, 2009. The site is within territory held by the Citrus Tract of the Withlacoochee State Forest.

In mid-2018, construction of an extension of the Suncoast Parkway which was to go through this site was stopped abruptly due to lawsuits filed. The injunction halting construction was lifted less than a month later, allowing construction to proceed.

References

Archaeological sites on the National Register of Historic Places in Florida
Buildings and structures in Citrus County, Florida
National Register of Historic Places in Citrus County, Florida
2009 establishments in Florida